Antonina Georgievna Borissova (1903–1970) was a Soviet botanist, specialising in the flora of the deserts and semi-desert of central Asia.  Borissova authored 195 land plant species names, the ninth-highest number of such names authored by any female scientist.

Plants 
Among the plants she identified are: 
 Rhodiola arctica Boriss.= sin. de Rhodiola rosea (L.) (planta de la estepa rusa, que potencia el organismo, y en particular la actividad reproductiva). (Crassulaceae)
 Rhodiola rosea L. subsp. arctica (Boriss.) Á.Löve & D.Löve
 Rhodiola coccinea (Royle) Boriss. (Crassulaceae)
 Rhodiola heterodonta (Hook.f. & Thomson) Boriss. (Crassulaceae)
 Rhodiola iremelica Boriss. (Crassulaceae)
 Rhodiola komarovii Boriss. (Crassulaceae)
 Rhodiola linearifolia Boriss. (Crassulaceae)
 Rhodiola pamiroalaica Boriss. (Crassulaceae)
 Rhodiola pinnatifida Boriss. (Crassulaceae)
 Rhodiola recticaulis Boriss. (Crassulaceae)
 Hyssopus cuspidatus Boriss. (Lamiaceae).
 Hyssopus tianschanicus Boriss. (Lamiaceae)
 Mentha alaica Boriss. (Lamiaceae)
 Mentha darvasica Boriss. (Lamiaceae)
 Mentha pamiroalaica Boriss. (Lamiaceae)
 Astragalus inopinatus Boriss. (Fabaceae)

These species of succulent are named in her honour:
 Sedum borissovae Balk.
 Sempervivum borissovae Wale 1946

References

Soviet botanists
Botanists active in Central Asia
1903 births
1970 deaths
Soviet women scientists
Burials at Serafimovskoe Cemetery